Alan May is a Canadian ice hockey player.

Alan May may also refer to:

Alan Nunn May (1911–2003), English physicist and Soviet spy
Alan Le May (1899–1964), American novelist and screenplay writer

See also
Allen May (born 1969), racecar driver
Alan Mayes (born 1953), retired English footballer